Hammerfest is a municipality in Troms og Finnmark county, Norway. Hammerfest is the northernmost town in the world with more than 10,000 inhabitants. The administrative centre of the municipality is the town of Hammerfest. Some of the main villages in the municipality include Rypefjord, Kvalsund, Forsøl, Hønsebybotn, Akkarfjord i Kvaløya, Akkarfjord i Sørøya, and Kårhamn.

The  municipality is the 19th largest by area out of the 356 municipalities in Norway. Hammerfest is the 102nd most populous municipality in Norway with a population of 11,274.

The municipality encompasses parts of three large islands: Kvaløya, Sørøya, and Seiland. Other small islands such as Håja, Lille Kamøya and Kamøya are also located here. Most parts of the municipality do not have a road connection with the rest of Norway; only Kvaløya island is connected to the mainland, via the Kvalsund Bridge.

General information
A municipality called Hammerfest by og landdistrikt (Hammerfest town and district) was established on 1 January 1838 (see formannskapsdistrikt law), which included the town of Hammerfest and the vast rural district surrounding it. The law at that time required that all towns should be separated from their rural districts, but because of low population and very few voters, this was impossible to carry out for Hammerfest in 1838. (This was also the case in the nearby towns of Vadsø and Vardø.) In 1839, the northern district (population: 498) was separated to become a new municipality of Maasø. This left Hammerfest by og landdistrikt with 2,024 residents. On 1 January 1852, the rural district outside of the town (population: 1,256) was separated from the town to form a new municipality of Hammerfest landdistrikt. This left the town with 1,125 residents. (The rural district was later divided into two municipalities with Sørøysund in the north and Kvalsund in the south.)

On 1 January 1992, the municipality of Sørøysund (population: 2,341) was merged with the town of Hammerfest (population: 6,909) to form a new, larger municipality called Hammerfest.

In 2017, the two neighboring municipalities of Hammerfest and Kvalsund voted to merge into one large municipality effective 1 January 2020, and that merger came into effect on the planned date. Also on the same day, the new municipality became part of the newly formed Troms og Finnmark county. Previously, it had been part of the old Finnmark county.

Name
The municipality is named after the town of Hammerfest that was established in 1789. The town was named after an old anchorage. The first element is hammer, referring to a number of large rocks, good for mooring boats, called Hamran (Old Norse: Hamarr meaning "steep mountainside"). The Hamran were covered up in land reclaiming during the early post-war years. The last element is fest, from Old Norse  which means "fastening" (for boats).

Coat of arms
The coat of arms was granted on 16 December 1938, in preparation for the celebration of the 150th anniversary of the town's establishment in 1939. The official blazon is "Gules, a polar bear statant argent". This means the arms have a red field (background) and the charge is a polar bear. The polar bear has a tincture of argent which means it is commonly colored white, but if it is made out of metal, then silver is used. The polar bear was chosen as a symbol for the fishing in the polar seas north of Norway. The polar bear itself is not native to mainland Norway. Because of its town status, the arms often have a mural crown above them. The arms were designed by Ole Valle and the design was updated by Arvid Steen in 2001.

Churches
The Church of Norway has three parishes within the municipality of Hammerfest. It is part of the Hammerfest prosti (deanery) in the Diocese of Nord-Hålogaland.

History

Many grave sites dating back to the Stone Age can be found here. This location was an important fishing and Arctic hunting settlement for a long time before it was given market town rights by royal decree of Christian VII of Denmark–Norway in 1789.

Napoleonic Wars
During the Napoleonic Wars, Denmark–Norway broke its neutrality after a Royal Navy fleet launched a pre-emptive attack on Copenhagen, allying with France against the Coalition. As one of the main centres of commerce and transportation in western Finnmark, Hammerfest became a target of the Royal Navy's naval blockade. Thus, upon the request of local merchants, the town received four six-pound cannons from the central armoury in Trondheim. Subsequently, a fifty-man strong coastal defence militia was formed to defend Hammerfest from a possible naval assault. A number of merchants formed the officer corps of the militia, while Sea Samis and Kvens were mobilized as gun crews and soldiers.

British attack
On 22 July 1809, the expected British attack came when the brigs HMS Snake and HMS Fancy approached the town. Before reaching Hammerfest, the two vessels had successfully attacked the village of Hasvik. The following battle between Hammerfest's two two-cannon batteries and the Royal Navy warships with a combined number of thirty-two cannon between them was unusually intense and did not end before the Norwegian cannons had run out of gunpowder after about 90 minutes of combat. Both warships had suffered a number of cannonball hits and had at least one fatal casualty; a sailor who was buried at the local cemetery. During the battle, the local populace evacuated the town, and the Snake and Fancy remained in the town for eight days after the Norwegian defenders withdrew. The crews sacked the empty town before withdrawing.

Improved fortifications
After the raid, Hammerfest became a garrison town with some regular troops and much improved and expanded fortifications. A small flotilla of cannon-armed rowing boats also operated out of Hammerfest for the remainder of the Napoleonic Wars.

Fire of 1890
Hammerfest was struck by a fire in 1890 which started in the bakery and wiped out almost half the town's houses. After the fire Hammerfest received donations and humanitarian assistance from across the world, with the biggest single donor being Kaiser Wilhelm II of Germany. The Kaiser had personally visited the town several times on his yacht and had great affection for the small northern settlement.

Electric street lighting
In 1891, Hammerfest became the first urban settlement in Northern Europe to get electrical street lights. The invention was brought to Hammerfest by two of the town's merchants who had seen it demonstrated at a fair in Paris.

Destruction in World War II

After their victory in the Norwegian Campaign of the Second World War, the Germans soon fortified Hammerfest and used it as a major base. The importance of Hammerfest to the Germans increased dramatically after their invasion of the Soviet Union in 1941. The occupiers installed three coastal batteries in and around Hammerfest, one with four  guns on Melkøya island near the town, one with three 10.5 cm guns on a hill right outside the town and a final battery with casemated  pieces on the Rypklubben peninsula near Rypefjord.

The main German U-boat base in Finnmark was in Hammerfest, serving as a central supply base for the vessels attacking the allied supply convoys to Russia. Luftwaffe seaplanes were based at an improvised naval air station in nearby Rypefjord. The garrison in Hammerfest was also protected by around 4,000 mines and numerous anti-aircraft guns.

During their long retreat following the Petsamo-Kirkenes Operation, the Germans no longer managed to transport troops by sea further east due to intensive Red Air Force raids. Thus Hammerfest became their main shipping port in Finnmark in the autumn of 1944.

The town of Hammerfest was bombed twice by the Soviet Air Forces. The first time, on 14 February 1944, the town was hit by explosive and incendiary devices, but little damage was done. On 29 August 1944 Soviet bombers launched a second airstrike, inflicting significantly more damage to buildings and infrastructure in downtown Hammerfest. Two ships were sunk in the harbour. The ships lost were the local transports Tanahorn and Brynilen.

The population was forcibly evacuated by the occupying German troops in the autumn of 1944 after a Soviet offensive at the northern extremity of the Eastern Front pushed into eastern Finnmark. All of Finnmark including the town was looted and burned to the ground by the Germans when they retreated in 1945, the last of the town having been destroyed by the time the Germans finally left on 10 February 1945. Only the town's small funeral chapel, built in 1937, was left standing. The Museum of Reconstruction in Hammerfest tells the story of these events and the recovery of the region. The Soviet troops in eastern Finnmark were withdrawn in September 1945.

Mines and munitions left over from the Second World War are still being found and disposed of in the Hammerfest area.

Geography
The island municipality encompasses parts of the mainland as well as three large islands: Kvaløya, Sørøya, and Seiland. Other small islands such as Lille Kamøya and Kamøya are also located here. Seiland National Park is partially located in the municipality. Seilandsjøkelen is a large glacier in the park. The Nordefjorden is a fjord that is part of the park. The mountains Komagaksla and Seilandstuva are some of the largest mountains in the municipality.

Hammerfest claims to be the northernmost city in the world, although the title is disputed by the nearby Norwegian town of Honningsvåg (achieved town status 1996). The validity of the claim depends upon one's definition of a city; although Hammerfest is further south than Honningsvåg it has a population over 10,000, which is required by Norwegian law to achieve town status (law from 1997). In retrospect, Parliament ruled that a city should be located in a municipality with at least 5,000 inhabitants. But the provision has not been made retroactive. Honningsvåg is the northernmost town today, in Norway. Utqiagvik, Alaska, population c. 4,000, is further north than both the Norwegian towns, but does not lay claim to the title of northernmost town.  Some foreigners may find it strange that either Hammerfest or Honningsvåg claims to be cities, given the small size of both places and it may help to know that the Norwegian language does not distinguish between city and town. The closest translation for either term is the word by, meaning the translation from Norwegian to English is ambiguous. If both Hammerfest and Honningsvåg were to be defined according to old British tradition, neither of them would be considered cities, as neither has a cathedral. Both of them may, however, be considered towns, given the status of both settlements as economic hubs of the surrounding areas and the status as municipal centres.

Hammerfest is, together with Vardø, the oldest town in Northern Norway. The town of Hammerfest is situated on the island of Kvaløya, with road connection to the mainland using the Kvalsund Bridge.

Climate
Hammerfest has a subarctic climate (Köppen climate classification Dfc).
Hammerfest often experiences heavy snowfall in winter, and on some occasions, avalanches or risk of avalanches have forced some inhabitants to be evacuated from their exposed homes until the danger was over.

The "midnight sun" is above the horizon from 14 May to 31 July (79 days), and the period with continuous daylight lasts a bit longer, conversely the polar night lasts from 23 November to 19 January (59 days). The weather data is from Hammerfest Airport about 80 m elevation and 2 km from the town. Hammerfest town is at sea level, thus the town itself might be slightly warmer.

Earlier climate normal for Hammerfest

Government
All municipalities in Norway, including Hammerfest, are responsible for primary education (through 10th grade), outpatient health services, senior citizen services, unemployment and other social services, zoning, economic development, and municipal roads. The municipality is governed by a municipal council of elected representatives, which in turn elect a mayor.  The municipality falls under the Hammerfest District Court and the Hålogaland Court of Appeal.

Municipal council
The municipal council  of Hammerfest is made up of 35 representatives that are elected to four year terms. The party breakdown of the council is as follows:

Mayors
The mayors of Hammerfest:

1839–1841: Hans Cato Aall 
1841–1843: Henrik Øwre 
1843–1845: Hans Cato Aall 
1845–1846: Anton Magnus Søeberg 
1846–1851: Iver Christian Rostad 
1851–1854: Gerhard Wiesener 
1855-1855: Iver Christian Rostad  
1856-1856: Emanuel Dohren Peters 
1857–1858: Gerhard Wiesener 
1859–1860: Iver Christian Rostad  
1861–1862: Ole Johan Finckenhagen 
1863–1866: Elias Andreas Nilsen  
1867-1867: Ole Lund 
1868-1868: Jakob Sverdrup Smitt 
1869–1870: Ole Lund 
1871–1872: Jakob Sverdrup Smitt 
1873–1876: Ole Lund 
1877–1878: Carl Rein 
1879–1887: Marius Ørbek Berg (H)
1887–1891: Ole Lund (H)
1892-1892: Christian Finckenhagen (H)
1893-1893: Peder Johansen (V)
1894-1894: Christian Finckenhagen (H)
1895–1901: Ole Kristian Simonsen (H)
1902-1902: Peder Johansen (V)
1903–1913: Hans Alfred Hansen (V)
1914–1917: Olaf Eriksen (Ap)
1918-1918: Svein O. Øraker (Ap)
1919-1920: Olaf Eriksen (Ap)
1921–1923: Sigurd M. Eriksen (Ap)
1924–1925: Charles Robertson (H)
1926–1931: Sigurd M. Eriksen (Ap)
1932–1934: Hans Sætrum (Ap)
1935-1935: Sigurd Marius Eriksen (Ap)
1936-1936: Leif S. Olsen (Ap)
1936–1941: Thoralf Albrigtsen (Ap)
1941–1944: Peder J. Berg (NS)
1945-1945: Thoralf Albrigtsen (Ap)
1946–1951: Harald J. Olsen (Ap)
1952–1961: Ørjan Østvik (Ap)
1962–1966: Anton Eide (Ap)
1966-1966: Ragnvald Jacobsen (Ap)
1967–1971: Aksel Olsen (Ap)
1972–1975: Arnulf Olsen (Ap)
1976–1983: Erling Jensen (Ap)
1984–1987: Arnulf Olsen (Ap)
1988–1995: Kåre Rønbeck (Ap)
1995–1999: Tormod Bartholdsen (H)
1999–2006: Alf E. Jakobsen (Ap)
2006–2009: Kristine Jørstad Bock (Ap)
2009–2019: Alf E. Jakobsen (Ap)
2019–2021: Marianne Sivertsen Næss (Ap)
2021–present: Terje Wikstrøm (Ap)

Economy and tourism

The construction of the large liquefied natural gas site on Melkøya (island) just off Hammerfest, which will process natural gas from Snøhvit, is the most expensive construction project in the history of Northern Norway. This project has resulted in an economic boom and new optimism in Hammerfest in recent years, a stark contrast to the economic downhill and negative population growth most other municipalities in Finnmark are experiencing. After the opening of natural gas production on Melkøya there have been some problems with significant smoke and soot pollution in the initial production phases. Snøhvit is Europe's first export facility for liquefied natural gas.

Hammerfest offers sport and commercial fishing, both sea and freshwater, as well as scuba diving. The northernmost glacier on the Norwegian mainland is a hiking destination. The town is a starting point for northern tours. There is a daily boat to the North Cape. One chain of the Struve Geodetic Arc, now on the World Heritage List, is located at Fuglenes in Hammerfest.

Hammerfest is also a centre of Sami culture. Hammerfest is home to the Royal and Ancient Polar Bear Society; a museum displaying the history of Arctic hunting.

The newspaper Hammerfestingen is published in Hammerfest.

American author Bill Bryson begins his European travels in 1990, documented in his book Neither Here Nor There, with a visit to Hammerfest in order to see the Northern Lights, calling it "an agreeable enough town in a thank-you-God-for-not-making-me-live-here sort of way".

Transportation
Hammerfest is connected to the main road network by Norwegian national road 94 which branches off from European route E6 at Skaidi in the neighbouring municipality of Kvalsund. The town is a port of call for the Hurtigruten ship route. Hammerfest also has Finnmark's third largest airport, Hammerfest Airport, opened 30 July 1974. Before the opening of the airport, the only air link to Hammerfest was by seaplane, the first route established in 1936.

Reindeer problems

During the summer, massive reindeer herds migrate from their winter pastures in the inner parts of Finnmark to the coast. Among the islands inhabited by reindeer during the summer months is Kvaløya, the island on which Hammerfest town is located. For years many of the 2,500 to 3,000 reindeer in the area have been coming into the town itself, wandering in the streets and among the houses. Although popular with tourists, this has been less favourably received by the town's population, with people complaining of traffic disturbances and the dung and urine left by the animals. For hygienic reasons large sums of money have to be spent every year to clean up after the animals. However, as of the 2008 reindeer season, the fence had proven ineffective, with reindeer managing to pass through on road crossings, despite the presence of electrified grates embedded in the ground. The problem continues – the mayor, Alf E. Jakobsen, joked during the local election in 2011 that he was contemplating a career as a reindeer herder if he lost the vote.

International relations

Twin towns – Sister cities 

Hammerfest is town twinned with the following foreign settlements:
 – Haparanda, Sweden
 – Ikast, Denmark
 – Kola, Russia
 – Mokpo, South Korea
 – Petersburg, Alaska, United States
 – Tornio, Finland
 – Trelleborg, Sweden
 – Ushuaia, Argentina

Foreign consulates
Denmark, Sweden, Finland and the Netherlands have honorary consulates in Hammerfest.

Notable people

 Sir John Rice Crowe (1795–1877) an English businessman and diplomat,  deputy vice-consul in Hammerfest and British consul in Finnmark, lived in Hammerfest
 Ole Olsen (1850–1927) a Norwegian organist, composer, conductor and military musician
 Adolf Lindstrøm (1866–1939) a Norwegian chef and polar explorer
 Paal Berg (1873–1968) a Norwegian politician, 12th Chief Justice of the Supreme Court, 1929 to 1946
Charles Robertson (1875–1958), Norwegian Minister of Trade 1926–1928
 Jørgen Holmboe (1902–1979) a Norwegian-American meteorologist
 Per Møystad Backe (1914–1991) a Norwegian jurist, developed Scandinavian Airlines
 Annemarie Lorentzen (1921–2008) teacher in Hammerfest, politician and Norwegian ambassador to Iceland 1978 to 1985
 Knut Moe (1921–1989) a Norwegian resistance member in WWII and radio agent for the SIS
 Kåre Berg (1932–2009) a Norwegian professor in medical genetics, discovered the Lipoprotein(a)
 Sven Ullring (born 1935) a Norwegian engineer and businessperson
 Turi Josefsen (born 1936) a Norwegian-American businesswoman
 Kåre Kivijärvi (1938-1991) a Norwegian photographer, did photojournalistic work in Northern Norway
 Bjørn Sundquist (born 1948) a Norwegian actor, famous for TV, theatre and movie roles 
 Annelise Josefsen (born 1949), Norwegian-Sami artist
 Bodil Niska (born 1954) a Norwegian jazz musician on saxophone, grew up in Hammerfest
 Samoth (born 1974) as Thomas Thormodsæter Haugen, a black metal musician and multi-instrumentalist
 Gunnar Garfors (born 1975) a Norwegian traveller, author, media professional and public speaker
 Máret Ánne Sara (born 1983) a Sami artist and author, lives and works in Kautokeino

Sport 
 Fred Børre Lundberg (born 1969) a Nordic skier, won two team silver medals and one team gold medal at the Winter Olympics and an individual gold at the 1994 Winter Olympics
 Christine Bøe Jensen (born 1975) a former footballer, team gold medallist at the 2000 Summer Olympics

Bibliography

References

External links
Municipal fact sheet  from Statistics Norway 
Webcam Hammerfest

Information from Statoil about the Snøhvit LNG construction
Tromsø University Museum: Maritime hunter - fishers through 10,000 years at Melkøya
Hammerfest official tourist information
Finnmark University College
Arctic booms as climate change melts polar ice cap
Power station using tidal current as energy in Kvalsund
Goliat oil field larger than previously thought
Information about the planned natural gas power plant with CO2 reduction 

 
Municipalities of Troms og Finnmark
1838 establishments in Norway
Populated places of Arctic Norway
Populated coastal places in Norway